Alexander Roinashvili (also known by his Russified name, Alexander Solomonovich Roinov) (1846 – 1898) was the first Georgian photographer. He is known for his photos of the Caucasian landscapes and portraits of contemporary Georgian intellectuals.

Born in the mountainous community of Dusheti, east Georgia, then part of the Russian Empire, Roinashvili took photographic classes at the Khlamov studio in Tiflis. He began his career as a photographer in Tiflis in 1865 and soon set up his own studio. Closely associated with the Georgian national movement, he was involved in documenting cultural heritage in Georgia and organized a mobile museum of photography which toured across the Caucasus and Russia proper.

References

External links 
A. Roinashvili's photogallery.  The Georgian Museum of Photography

1846 births
1898 deaths
Burials at Didube Pantheon
Photographers from Georgia (country)